Julie Loranger (born 1937 in Montreal, Quebec) is a Canadian lawyer and former Ambassador to Spain and to Cuba (1992-?).

When she started working with External Affairs in 1972 as a desk officer in the United States relations office, Loranger's work focused on the boundary waters from the Columbia River to the Great Lakes.  At the time, transborder bridges were an issue and Loranger earned the nickname “Miss Bridges.”

In 1978, she became Canada's second consul general to Strasbourg, a post she held for four years.

She earned a BA from the University of Paris, a civil law degree from McGill University, an MA in International Law from Institut des Hautes Etudes Internationales and a doctorate from the University of Navarra.

References

Ambassadors of Canada to Spain
Canadian women ambassadors
University of Navarra alumni
Ambassadors of Canada to Cuba
University of Paris alumni
McGill University Faculty of Law alumni
People from Montreal
1937 births
Living people
Date of birth missing (living people)